CoRoT-6b (previously named CoRoT-Exo-6b) is an exoplanet that was reportedly discovered by the CoRoT mission team on February 2, 2009, orbiting the F type star CoRoT-6. It is located in the Ophiuchus constellation.

Properties and location
This planetary object is reported to be about 3.3 times the mass of the planet Jupiter and 1.17 times its size with an orbital period of 8.88 days. It is a hot Jupiter with a temperature between 700 and 1000 °C.

References

External links

 ESA Portal - Exoplanet hunt update

Exoplanets discovered in 2009
Giant planets
Hot Jupiters
Transiting exoplanets
Monoceros (constellation)
6b